Per Hånberg (born February 10, 1967) is a Swedish former professional ice hockey player. He is currently the head coach of the Karlskrona HK of the Swedish Hockey League (SHL). Hånberg played with AIK IF during the 1987–88 Elitserien season.

On April 25, 2014, Hånberg was announced as the new head coach for Karlskrona HK, then of the Swedish HockeyAllsvenskan.

References

External links

1967 births
Living people
AIK IF players
Swedish ice hockey coaches
Swedish ice hockey forwards
Ice hockey people from Stockholm